Jansug Charkviani (30 September 1931 – 6 November 2017) was a Georgian poet. He was a member of the Parliament of Georgia from 1992 to 2004.

Born in Tbilisi, Charkviani graduated from the Tbilisi State University in 1953. He had his first poems published in 1947. From the 1960s to the 1990s he was also an editor of several literary magazines. He was awarded, among other prizes, the Shota Rustaveli Prize (1984), Georgia's Order of Honor, and the title of Honorary Citizen of Tbilisi (1996).

References 

20th-century poets from Georgia (country)
Writers from Tbilisi
Tbilisi State University alumni
Recipients of the Order of Honor (Georgia)
Rustaveli Prize winners
Members of the Parliament of Georgia
1931 births
2017 deaths
Burials at Mtatsminda Pantheon